Andrea Hegen is a Paralympian athlete from Germany competing mainly in category F42-46 javelin throw events.

She competed in the 2004 Summer Paralympics in Athens, Greece. There she won a bronze medal in the women's F42-46 javelin throw event.

She competed in the 2008 Summer Paralympics in Beijing, China. There she went one better winning a silver medal in the women's F42-46 javelin throw event.

External links
 

Paralympic athletes of Germany
Athletes (track and field) at the 2008 Summer Paralympics
Athletes (track and field) at the 2004 Summer Paralympics
Paralympic silver medalists for Germany
Paralympic bronze medalists for Germany
Living people
Medalists at the 2004 Summer Paralympics
Medalists at the 2008 Summer Paralympics
Year of birth missing (living people)
Paralympic medalists in athletics (track and field)
German female javelin throwers
21st-century German women